Maren Rotstigen Skjøld (born 29 September 1993) is a Norwegian retired alpine skier.

At the 2014 Junior World Championships she participated in five events, with an 11th place in super combined as her best result. She made her FIS Alpine Ski World Cup debut in January 2016 in Flachau, where she didn't manage to qualify for the second run, and collected her first World Cup points with a 24th-place finish in February in Crans Montana. She won the 2015-16 Alpine Skiing Europa Cup overall title.

She represents the sports club Gjøvik SK.

World Cup results

Results per discipline

World Championship results

Olympic results

References

External links
 
 
 

1993 births
Living people
Sportspeople from Gjøvik
Norwegian female alpine skiers
Olympic alpine skiers of Norway
Alpine skiers at the 2018 Winter Olympics
Medalists at the 2018 Winter Olympics
Olympic medalists in alpine skiing
Olympic bronze medalists for Norway